Jai Santoshi Maa is a 1975 Indian Hindi-language devotional film directed by Vijay Sharma and written R. Priyadarshi. Santoshī Mā (also called Santoshi Mata) is the goddess of satisfaction.  Usha Mangeshkar, sang the devotional songs for the film along with Mahendra Kapoor and the famous poet Kavi Pradeep, who wrote the lyrics of the songs. Made on a low-budget, the film became one of the most successful films at the box office.

Plot
The film opens in the Devaloka, where we witness the "birth" of Goddess Santoshi Mata as the daughter of Ganesha, the elephant headed god of good beginnings, his two wives Riddhi and Siddhi ("prosperity" and "spiritual power"), sons Kshema and Labha ("prosperity" and "profit"). Although, Ganesha has another wife Buddhi ("wisdom"), she is not portrayed in the film.

A key role is played by the immortal sage Narada, a devotee of Vishnu, and a cosmic busybody who regularly intervenes to advance the film's two parallel plots, which concern both human beings and gods.

We soon meet the 18th-century maiden Satyavati Sharma (Kanan Kaushal), Santoshi Mata's greatest earthly devotee, leading a group of women in an aarti to the goddess. This first song, "Main To Arti Utaru" (I perform Mother Santoshi's aarti) exemplifies through its camerawork the experience of darshan —of "seeing" and being seen by a deity in the reciprocal act of "visual communion" that is central to Hindu worship.

Through the Mother's grace, Satyavati soon falls in love with Brijmohan aka Birju, the youngest of seven brothers in a prosperous Bias Brahmin farmer family, an artistic man, with a talent for singing. Alas, with the boy come the in-laws, and two of Birju's six sisters-in-law, Durga and Maya are jealous shrews who have it in for him and Satyavati from the beginning. To make matters worse, Narada "stirs up" the "jealousy" of the three principal goddesses, Lakshmi, Parvati, and Saraswati against the "upstart" goddess Santoshi Mata. They decide to examine (pariksha) her perseverance or faith (Shraddha) by making life miserable for her chief devotee. Of course, this is all just a charade and the holy goddesses are just acting as if they are jealous of Santoshi Mata to test Satyavati's devotion.

After a fight with his relatives, Birju leaves home to seek his fortune, narrowly escaping a watery grave (planned for him by the goddesses) through his wife's devotion to Santoshi Mata. Nevertheless, the divine ladies convince his family that he is indeed dead, adding the stigma of widowhood to Satyavati's other woes. Her sisters-in-law treat her like a slave, beat and starve her, and a local rogue attempts to rape her; Santoshi Mata rescues her several times. Eventually, Satyavati is driven to attempt suicide, but is stopped by Narada, who tells her about the sixteen-Fridays fast in honour of Santoshi Mata, which can grant any wish. Satyavati completes it with great difficulty and more divine assistance, and just in the nick of time: for the now-prosperous Birju, stricken with amnesia by the goddesses and living in a distant place, has fallen in love with a rich merchant's daughter. Through Santoshi Mata's grace, he gets his memory back and returns home laden with wealth. When he discovers the awful treatment given to his wife, he builds a palatial home for the two of them, complete with an in-house temple to the Holy Mother. Satyavati plans a grand ceremony upon the completion of her fast and invites her in-laws. But the celestials and sadistic sisters-in-law make a last-ditch effort to ruin her by squeezing lime juice into one of the dishes (the rules of Santoshi Mata's fast forbid eating, or serving, any sour or bitter food). All hell breaks loose, before peace is finally restored, on earth as it is in heaven, and a new deity is triumphantly welcomed to the pantheon, as Lakshmi, Saraswati and Parvati have been convinced of Satyavati's devotion.

Cast
Kanan Kaushal as Satyavati Vyas (née Sharma)
Ashish Kumar as Brijmohan ("Birju") Vyas 
Anita Guha as Shri Santoshi Mata
Bharat Bhushan as Pandit Devidutt Sharma, Satyavati's Father
Rajani Bala as Geeta
Trilok Kapoor as Lord Shiva
Bela Bose as Durga Vyas
B. M. Vyas as Geeta Father and jeweller businessman
Rajan Haksar  as Bhairav "Bhairavram" Vyas
Manohar Desai as Dayakar ("Dayaram") Vyas
Dilip Dutta  
Mahipal as Devarishi Narada
Padmarani as Devi Mata Brahmani
Leela Mishra
 Sushila Devi

Soundtrack

Song composed by C. Arjun and lyricist written by Kavi Pradeep

Awards and nominations
BFJA Award for Best Male Playback Singer (Hindi Section) – Pradeep for the song "Yahan Wahan"
BFJA Award for Best Female Playback Singer (Hindi Section) – Usha Mangeshkar
Filmfare Nomination for Best Female Playback Singer – Usha Mangeshkar for the song "Main To Aarti"

References

External links

1970s Hindi-language films
1975 films
Hindu mythological films